Rajanagar (Sl. No.: 99) is a Vidhan Sabha constituency of Kendrapara district, Odisha.

This constituency includes Pattamundai (M), Rajanagar block and 18 Gram panchayats (Bachhara, Srirampur, Damarpur, Sansarphal, Khanata, Oupada, Chandanagar, Sasana, Dosia, Khadianta, Gangarampur, Aradapali, Sanjharia, Badapada, Bilikana, Badamohanpur, Dihudipur and Balabhadrapur) of Pattamundai block.

Elected Members
Sixteen elections were held between 1951 and 2019 including one By-Poll in 1971.
Elected members from the Rajanagar constituency are:
{| class="wikitable"
|+
! colspan="4" |2019 Vidhan Sabha Election, Rajnagar
|-
|Party
|Candidates
|Votes
|%
|-
|BJD
|Dhruba Sahoo
|
|
|-
|INC
|Anshuman Mohanty
|
|
|-
|BJP
|Alekh Kumar Jena
|
|
|-
|Independent
|Ajaya Kumar Behera
|
|
|-
|Independent
|Sunita Pradhan
|
|
|}

2019: (99): Dhruba Sahoo (BJD)
2014: (32): Anshuman Mohanty (Congress)
2009: (99): Alekh Kumar Jena (BJD)
2004: (32): Nalini Kanta Mohanty (Congress)
2000: (32): Nalini Kanta Mohanty (BJD)
1995: (32): Nalini Kanta Mohanty (Janata Dal)
1990: (32): Nalini Kanta Mohanty (Janata Dal)
1985: (32): Nalini Kanta Mohanty (Janata Party)
1980: (32): Nalini Kanta Mohanty (JNP (SC))
1977: (32): Nalini Kanta Mohanty (Janata Party)
1974: (32): Biju Patnaik (UTC)
1971: (By-Poll): Biju Patnaik (UTC)
1971: (30): Prahallad Mallick (UTC)
1967: (30): Shailendra Bhanja Deo (Independent)
1961: (110): Padma Charan Nayak (Independent)
1957: (78): Ananta Charan Tripathy (Independent)
1951: (68): Saraswati Dei (Congress)

2019 Election Candidates

2014 Election Candidates

2009 Election Results
In 2009 election, Biju Janata Dal candidate Alekh Kumar Jena defeated Indian National Congress candidate Nalini Kanta Mohanty by a margin of 4,335 votes.

Notes

References

Assembly constituencies of Odisha
Kendrapara district